Saddem Hmissi (born 16 February 1991 in Nabeul, Tunisia) is a Tunisian volleyball player. He is 186 cm high and plays as a libero.

Clubs

Awards

Club
  1 African Champions League (2014)
  1 Arab Clubs Championship (2014)
  1 Tunisian League (2015)
  1 Tunisian Cup (2014)

National team
  1 Arab Championship (2012)
  1 African Championship U21 (2010)
  1 Arab Championship U19 (2009)
  1 African Championship U19 (2008)

References

Page at FIVB.org

People from Nabeul
1991 births
Living people
Tunisian men's volleyball players
Mediterranean Games silver medalists for Tunisia
Competitors at the 2013 Mediterranean Games
Mediterranean Games medalists in volleyball
Volleyball players at the 2020 Summer Olympics
Olympic volleyball players of Tunisia
21st-century Tunisian people